The Birmingham Vulcans were a professional American football team located in Birmingham, Alabama. They were members of the five-team Eastern Division of the World Football League (WFL). The Vulcans, founded in March 1975, played in the upstart league's second and final season in 1975.  The team was owned by a group of Birmingham businessmen with Ferd Weil as team president.

The Vulcans replaced the Birmingham Americans who had held the WFL franchise for Birmingham in 1974, winning World Bowl I in December 1974 before suffering financial collapse. The Vulcans were the best team in the league in 1975 with a 9–3 record and the best at the box office until the league folded 12 weeks into its second season. After the WFL ceased operations, the Vulcans were declared league champions by virtue of having the best record.

When the league folded, Birmingham and the Memphis Grizzlies attempted to get admitted into the National Football League for the 1976 season, although unlike the similar and more extensive effort in Memphis which involved actual cash deposits toward season tickets, it seemed to consist mainly of getting fans to sign a "statement of support" somewhat similar to a petition.  When the Memphis effort failed, Vulcans followers were forced to accept the inevitable as well, and efforts to get the team into the more established league were abandoned.

The Vulcans name would be recycled for the Alabama Vulcans, a member of the American Football Association, in 1979.

, two former Vulcans players have been inducted into the Alabama Sports Hall of Fame.  Birmingham native Johnny "Italian Stallion" Musso, who placed 4th in Heisman Trophy voting while playing for the Alabama Crimson Tide, was inducted in the Class of 1989. Larry Willingham, who played for the St. Louis Cardinals and retired for medical reasons in 1973 but made a comeback in 1974 with the Birmingham Americans, was inducted in the Class of 2003.  Willingham was also elected to the Auburn Tigers football "1970s Team of the Decade."

Schedule and results

1975 regular season

See also
Birmingham Americans
1975 World Football League season
1975 in sports

References

External links
 WFL1974 – a Birmingham Americans & Vulcans history site
 BirminghamProSports.com

 
Defunct American football teams
American football teams in Birmingham, Alabama
American football teams established in 1975
American football teams disestablished in 1975
1975 establishments in Alabama
1975 disestablishments in Alabama